Cheung Wah Estate is a mixed TPS and public housing estate in Fanling, New Territories, Hong Kong. It is the first public housing estate in Fanling Town, consisting of ten residential blocks completed from 1984 to 1986. Some of the flats were sold to tenants through Tenants Purchase Scheme Phase 6A in 2004.

Houses

Demographics
According to the 2016 by-census, Cheung Wah Estate had a population of 13,109. The median age was 49.2 and the majority of residents (99 per cent) were of Chinese ethnicity. The average household size was 2.7 people. The median monthly household income of all households (i.e. including both economically active and inactive households) was HK$22,490.

Politics
Cheung Wah Estate is located in Cheung Wah constituency of the North District Council. It was formerly represented by Chan Yuk-ming, who was elected in the 2019 elections until July 2021.

See also

Public housing estates in Fanling

References

Residential buildings completed in 1984
Residential buildings completed in 1986
Fanling
Public housing estates in Hong Kong
Tenants Purchase Scheme
Housing estates with centralized LPG system in Hong Kong